Martin Henrichsen Vahl (10 October 1749 – 24 December 1804) was a Danish-Norwegian botanist, herbalist and zoologist.

Biography
Martin Vahl was born in Bergen, Norway and attended  Bergen Cathedral School. He edited Flora Danica fasc. XVI-XXI (1787–1799), Symbolæ Botanicæ I-III (1790–1794), Eclogæ Americanæ I-IV (1796–1807) and Enumeratio Plantarum I-II (1804–1805). He lectured at the University of Copenhagen Botanical Garden from 1779 to 1782.

Vahl made several research trips in Europe and North Africa between 1783 and 1788. He became professor at the Society for Natural History at the University of Copenhagen in 1786 and was a full professor of botany from 1801 to his death. In 1792, he was elected a foreign member of the Royal Swedish Academy of Sciences. He died in Copenhagen, Denmark at age 55. His son Jens Vahl also became a botanist.

Authority name
This botanist is denoted by the author abbreviation Vahl when citing a botanical name.

References

Other sources
 Christensen, Carl (1932) Martin Vahl, pp. 85–88 in: Meisen, V. Prominent Danish Scientists through the Ages. University Library of Copenhagen 450th Anniversary. Levin & Munksgaard, Copenhagen.

External links
 Facsimile of Enumeratio plantarum, Hauniae, 1805–1806.

19th-century Danish botanists
Botanists with author abbreviations
 01
1749 births
1804 deaths
Danish bryologists
Danish mycologists
Danish phycologists
Pteridologists
Botanists active in Africa
18th-century Norwegian botanists
People educated at the Bergen Cathedral School
Uppsala University alumni
University of Copenhagen alumni
Academic staff of the University of Copenhagen
Members of the Royal Swedish Academy of Sciences
18th-century Danish botanists
Scientists from Bergen